O'Gorman High School is a Catholic high school in Sioux Falls, South Dakota. The school was founded in 1961 and named after Thomas O'Gorman. O'Gorman is located in the Diocese of Sioux Falls.

History
The school opened in 1961, and high school students in the Diocese of Sioux Falls transitioned from the Cathedral School to O'Gorman. From 2008 to 2011, O'Gorman underwent a major addition that added two academic wings, a new chapel, and a new performing arts center.

OGHS was named a No Child Left Behind Blue Ribbon school in 1985, 2005, 2014, and 2021.

Athletics
O'Gorman is a member of the South Dakota High School Activities Association. O'Gorman started the Dakota Bowl in 1978, recognized as one of the first high school bowl games.  They have won the following SDHSAA State Championships:

 Boys Football - 1968, 1978, 1981, 1985, 1986, 1988, 1991, 1993, 2004, 2005, 2019
 Boys Basketball - 2006, 2007, 2010, 2011, 2012, 2017
 Boys Cross Country - 1994 
 Boys Tennis - 1980, 1981, 1982, 1983, 1988, 1989, 1990, 2003, 2005, 2009, 2010, 2011
 Boys Golf - 1976, 2001, 2002, 2003, 2010, 2011, 2013, 2021
 Boys Soccer - 2020 
 Girls Basketball - 1995, 2017, 2022
 Girls Cross Country - 1986, 1988, 2020 
 Girls Gymnastics - 1992, 1993, 2002, 2003, 2004, 2005 
 Girls Soccer - 2005
 Girls Tennis - 1973, 1976, 1977, 1978, 1979, 1980, 1987, 1992, 1993, 1994, 1995, 1996, 2007, 2008, 2009, 2010, 2011, 2012, 2013, 2014 
 Girls Golf - 1984, 1985, 1986, 1987, 1990, 1991, 1993, 2000, 2010, 2011, 2012, 2014, 2015, 2017, 2018, 2019, 2021  
 Girls Volleyball - 1987, 1988, 1989, 2002, 2020, 2021
 Baseball - 2010, 2012

Performing arts
The school fields two competitive show choirs, the mixed-gender "Ovation!" and the all-female "Encore!". Ovation! won a competition at the Mitchell Corn Palace in 2012. The school hosted the first South Dakota state championship competition in 2016.

Notable alumni 
Dusty Coleman - professional baseball player 
Larry Jacobson - professional football player
Kevin Truckenmiller - singer
Thomas Vanek - professional hockey player

References

External links 
School's Main Page

Catholic secondary schools in South Dakota
Educational institutions established in 1961
Education in Sioux Falls, South Dakota
Buildings and structures in Sioux Falls, South Dakota
1961 establishments in South Dakota
Schools in Minnehaha County, South Dakota
Roman Catholic Diocese of Sioux Falls